Rayon Sports Football Club is an association football club from Nyanza, Southern province, Rwanda, now based in Kigali. The team currently competes in the Rwanda National Football League, and plays its home games at the Stade Amahoro in Kigali and Kigali Stadium, Nyamirambo. For some years, its daily operations were held in the southern province in Nyanza District. They've won 9 Rwandan Premier League titles, the 2nd most Premier League titles. Throughout its history, the club has won 9 Rwandan Cups, 1 CECAFA Clubs' Cup, 9 peace Cups, 3 Agaciro Cups, 2 Intwali Cups and a Kigali 100 Years' Cup and 1 Father Fraipont memorial tournament.
The blues of Rwanda are said to have more than 80% of Football fans in the country, which makes it the most popular team in Rwanda and the only competent citizen-owned club in the country of a thousand hills.

History 
The club was founded in May 1968 in Nyanza, but moved to the nation's capital, Kigali, in 1986 before moving back in 2012 following an agreement with the Nyanza District authorities. Gikundiro spent few months in Nyanza and returned to Kigali where it is based currently.
 In 2012, the club also absorbed Nyanza Football Club, which was relegated from the Rwanda National Football League after the 2011–12 season.

Honours

Domestic competitions 
Rwanda National Football League: 9
 1975, 1981, 1997, 1998, 2002, 2004, 2013, 2016–2017, 2018–2019.

Rwandan Peace Cup: 9
 1976, 1979, 1982, 1989, 1993, 1995, 1998, 2005, 2016.

Rwandan Super Cup: 1
 2017.

International 
CECAFA Clubs Cup: 1
 1998.

Performance in CAF competitions 

CAF Champions League / African Cup of Champions Clubs : 9 appearances
1982 – Preliminary Round
1998 – First Round
1999 – Second Round
2001 – Preliminary Round
2003 – First Round
2005 – Preliminary Round
2014 – Preliminary Round
2018 – First Round
2020 – Preliminary Round

CAF Confederation Cup: 4 appearances
2006 – First Round
2008 – First Round
2017 – Second Round
2018 – Quarter Finals

CAF Cup: 2 appearances
1993 – Preliminary Round
2002 – Quarter-Finals

CAF Cup Winners' Cup: 4 appearances
1990 – First Round
1994 – Second Round
1996 – First Round
2000 – Second Round

Current squad (2021–22) 

Goal keepers

1. GK RWA Hakizimana Adolphe 22

2. GK TZ Ramadhan Kabwiri

3. GK RWA Hategekimana Bonheur 1

4. GK RWA AMÀN

DEFENDERS

5. RB RWA ganijuru elie

6. CD  RWA Mitima Isaac 23

7. CD RWA Ndizeye Samuel 25

8. CD RWA Rwatubyaye Abdul (C)4

9. RB RWA Muvandimwe JMV 12

10.LB  RWA Mujyanama Fidele

11.CD RWA Ngendahimana Eric 8

Midfielders

12.DMF BUR mbirizi Eric 66

13.DMF RWA Mugisha Francois 15

14.DMF RWA Manishimwe Eric 14

15.DMF NIG RAPHAEL Osalue 7

16.CM RWA Nishimwe Blaise 6

17.CM RWA kanamugire roger 5

18.CAM RWA ndekwe Felix 17

19.CAM RWA IRAGUHA HADJI

Strikers

20.CF MAL Camara Moussa 9

21.CF UGA Mussa Essenu 20

22.RW RWA IRADUKUNDA PASCAL 21

23. LW CAM Essombe Willy Onana 10

24. RW KEN Paul Were 11

25. CF MAL à Boubacar Traoré 3

26. RW RWA TUYISENGE Arsene 19

27. CF RWA Rudasingwa Prince 27

Staff 

 Head coach:
 Assist coach1: Lomami Marcel(caretaker)
Assist coach 2: Dusange Sasha
 Goalkeeper coach: Kalisa Calliopie
 Doctor: Mugemana Charles
 Team Manager : Adrien
 Kit manager : Claude
 CEO : ITANGISHAKA Bernard

Notable coaches 

 name N/A (19??–85)
 Longin Rudasingwa (1995–00)
 René Kalimunda (2007–08)
 Raoul Shungu (2009)
 Tierry Hitimana
 Baptiste Kayiranga
 Fatikaramu
 Kanyankore Gilbert Youndé
 Didier Gomes Da Rosa (2012–2013)
 Jean Marie Ntagwabira
 Luc Eymael
 David Donadei
 Masudi Djuma (2015–2017)
 Karekezi Olivier (2017–2018)
 Ivan Minnaert (2018)
 Roberto Oliveira Goncalves do Carmo (2018–)
 Javier Martinez Espinosa ( September 2019 To December 2019)
 Casa Bungo André (December 2019 to May 2020)
 Guy Bukasa (May 2020 to 2022)
 Haringingo Francis(Now)

References

External links 
 

Football clubs in Rwanda
Association football clubs established in 1968
1968 establishments in Rwanda